is a passenger railway station in located in the city of Katano, Osaka Prefecture, Japan, operated by the private railway company Keihan Electric Railway.

Lines
Kōzu Station is a station of the  Keihan Katano Line, and is located 3.4 kilometers from the terminus of the line at Hirakatashi Station.

Station layout
The station has two ground-level opposed side platforms connected by an underground passage.

Platforms

Adjacent stations

History
The station was opened on July 10, 1929.

Passenger statistics
In fiscal 2019, the station was used by an average of 6,768 passengers daily.

Surrounding area
Maruyama Kofun
Kozu Shrine 
Matsuzuka Park 
Kozu Ekimae Post Office 
Katano City Kozu Elementary School

See also
List of railway stations in Japan

References

External links

Official home page 

Railway stations in Osaka Prefecture
Railway stations in Japan opened in 1929
Katano, Osaka